Group A of the 1999 Fed Cup Americas Zone Group II was one of two pools in the Americas Zone Group II of the 1999 Fed Cup. Four teams competed in a round robin competition, with the top two teams advancing to the knockout stage.

Uruguay vs. Dominican Republic

Costa Rica vs. Guatemala

Uruguay vs. Guatemala

Dominican Republic vs. Costa Rica

Uruguay vs. Costa Rica

Dominican Republic vs. Guatemala

See also
Fed Cup structure

References

External links
 Fed Cup website

1999 Fed Cup Americas Zone